{{DISPLAYTITLE:C24H30O4}}
The molecular formula C24H30O4 (molar mass: 382.500 g/mol) may refer to:

 3,8-Dihydrodiligustilide
 Hexestrol dipropionate
 Methenmadinone acetate
 Testosterone furoate

Molecular formulas